Critic's Choice may refer to:

 Critics' Choice Movie Award
 Critics' Choice Super Awards
 Critics' Choice Television Award
 Critics' Choice Television Award for Best Actress in a Movie/Miniseries
 Critic's Choice (Brit Award)
 Critics' Choice (album), a 1958 album by Pepper Adams
 Critic's Choice (play), a 1960 Broadway play by Ira Levin
 Critic's Choice (film), a 1963 film directed by Don Weis starring Bob Hope and Lucille Ball and based on the stage play
 Critic's Choice: Top 200 Albums, a 1978 music reference book compiled by Paul Gambaccini

See also
 Critics Choice Association